SS Malakand was a 7,653-gross register ton cargo liner built by Harland & Wolff in 1905 for the Brocklebank shipping line, the first of two Brocklebank Line ships named after the Malakand area of the Indian subcontinent.

Malakand operated on a regular service between Liverpool, England, and Calcutta, India.

A replacement ship of the same name, was launched in 1919.

References

Steamships of the United Kingdom
World War I merchant ships of the United Kingdom
World War I shipwrecks in the Irish Sea
Ships built in Belfast
Cargo liners
Maritime incidents in 1917
Ships sunk by German submarines in World War I
Ships built by Harland and Wolff
1905 ships